James Whelan, O.P. (December 8, 1823 – February 18, 1878) was an Irish-born prelate of the Roman Catholic Church.  He served as the  second bishop of the Diocese of Nashville in Tennessee from 1860 to 1864.

Biography

Early life 
Whelan was born in Kilkenny, Ireland, and moved with his parents to the United States at age 10 or 12, settling in New York. He joined the Dominican Order in 1839 at the novitiate in Springfield, Kentucky, and made his profession in 1842. He studied philosophy and theology at the Dominican convent at Somerset, Ohio.

Whelan was ordained a priest for the Dominican Order by Bishop John Purcell on August 2, 1846. He then worked as a missionary before being appointed president in 1852 of St. Joseph's College in Somerset.  In 1854, he became provincial superior of St. Joseph's Province (which included all the United States except the Pacific Coast).

Coadjutor Bishop and Bishop of Nashville 
On April 15, 1859, Whelan was appointed coadjutor bishop of the Diocese of Nashville and Titular Bishop of Marcopolis by Pope Pius IX. He received his episcopal consecration on May 8, 1959, from Archbishop Peter Kenrick, with Bishops John Miège,  and Henry Juncker serving as co-consecrators, at the Cathedral of St. Louis in St. Louis, Missouri. 

When succeeded Bishop Richard Miles as bishop of Nashville upon the latter's death on February 21, 1860. He enlarged the cathedral and established an academy, boarding school, and orphanage.

As a border state, Tennessee was the scene of some of the most severe battles during the American Civil War . While passing through the front line after a visit with Bishop Martin Spalding in Louisville, Whelan was accused of making remarks within Union lines which the Confederates thought had influenced the movements of the Union Army.

Resignation and legacy 
The suspicions of his political loyalties coupled with the stresses of being bishop prompted Whelan to submit his resignation as bishop of Nashville to the Vatican.  On September 23, 1863, Pope Pius IX accepted the resignation and on February 12, 1864, appointed him as Titular Bishop of Diocletianopolis in Palaestina.

Whelan briefly retired to St. Joseph's Convent before taking up residence at St. Thomas Parish in Zanesville, Ohio. He devoted his time to theological, historical, and chemical studies, and published a defense of papal infallibility in 1871. 

James Whelan died on February 18, 1878, at age 54, in Zanesville.

References

Publications 
Defense of papal infallibiliy

Episcopal succession

1823 births
1878 deaths
Irish emigrants to the United States (before 1923)
People from County Kilkenny
American Dominicans
19th-century Roman Catholic bishops in the United States
American Roman Catholic clergy of Irish descent
Roman Catholic bishops of Nashville